Kilmeen GAA are a Junior A Gaelic football club from the south-west division (Carbery GAA) of County Cork, Ireland. The club competes in Carbery and Cork competitions. Their sister club in Hurling, Kilbree competes at Junior A level as of 2007.

Honours
 Cork Junior B Football Championship: Winner (2) 1984, 2015  Runner-Up 2012, 2014
 Cork Under-21 B Football Championship Runners-Up 2015 
 Cork Minor C Football Championship: Winners (2) 1994, 2011 Runners-Up 2007
 West Cork Junior B Football Championship: Winners (8) 1943, 1952, 1962, 1965, 1984, 2010 ,2013 ,2014 Runners-Up: 1942, 1953, 1961, 2008,2009, 2012, 2015
 West Cork Junior A Football Championship: Runners-Up 1987
 West Cork Junior D Football Championship: Winners 2016 Runners-Up  1983
 West Cork Minor C Football Championship:  Winners (3) 1994, 2007, 2011 Runners-Up 2002
 West Cork Minor C Football Championship:  Winners (1) 2011
 West Cork Under-21 A Football Championship: Winners (1) 1985
 West Cork Under-21 B Football Championship: Winners (3) 1983, 1984, 2015 Runners-Up 1979, 1996, 2011, 2014
 West Cork Under-21 C Football Championship: Winners (2) 1994, 2004 Runners-Up 1999, 2005

References

External sources

Gaelic games clubs in County Cork
Gaelic football clubs in County Cork